Biograph is a 53-track box set compilation spanning the career of American singer-songwriter Bob Dylan, released on November 7, 1985, by Columbia Records. Consisting of 53 released and unreleased tracks from 1962 to 1981, the box set was released as a five-LP set, a three-cassette tape set, and a three-compact disc set. Biograph reached  on the Billboard 200 in the U.S. and has been certified platinum by the RIAA.

Content
The recordings on Biograph are a mix of rarities, hit singles, and album tracks. They are not presented in chronological order; 18 of its 53 tracks had not been previously issued, and three more had only been previously available on singles. Every studio album released by Dylan prior to the appearance of this box set is represented by at least one track, with the exceptions of Self Portrait, Dylan, Desire, Infidels, and Empire Burlesque, although two songs from Desire appear in live versions and "Abandoned Love" is from the Desire sessions. The set comes accompanied with a 36-page booklet, containing rare photos and liner notes by Cameron Crowe, who interviews Dylan about each of the tracks.

While too comprehensive to be strictly a greatest hits album, it does include nine of the dozen Top 40 hits by Dylan during the time period covered. Missing are "Rainy Day Women#12 & 35", "George Jackson", and "Hurricane". Nine of the ten tracks from Bob Dylan's Greatest Hits appear on this compilation.

Initially released in all formats in a box conforming to the dimensions of a vinyl long-playing album, on August 19, 1997 it was reissued by Legacy Records in a smaller compact disc brick package, the tracks remastered using Sony's Super-Bit Mapping process. On August 6, 2002, it was reissued again in a booklet format with three discs; yet another new issue of this edition appeared in the marketplace on April 5, 2011. The 2011 edition was mastered at Sterling Sound Studios in New York City.

Track listing
All tracks written by Bob Dylan except "Baby Let Me Follow You Down" by Gary Davis, Dave Van Ronk, and Eric von Schmidt, and both "Isis" and "Romance in Durango" by Dylan and Jacques Levy. The compact disc running order is the same, except disc two ends with "Jet Pilot" inserted after "Isis". Disc one ends with "I Don't Believe You (She Acts Like We Never Have Met)", and disc two begins with "Visions of Johanna". Disc three begins with "Caribbean Wind".

Charts

References

1985 compilation albums
Bob Dylan compilation albums
Columbia Records compilation albums